The Upper Pittsgrove School District is a community public school district that serves students in pre-kindergarten through eighth grade from Upper Pittsgrove Township, in Salem County, New Jersey, United States.

As of the 2020–21 school year, the district, comprised of one school, had an enrollment of 303 students and 33.3 classroom teachers (on an FTE basis), for a student–teacher ratio of 9.1:1.

The district is classified by the New Jersey Department of Education as being in District Factor Group "DE", the fifth-highest of eight groupings. District Factor Groups organize districts statewide to allow comparison by common socioeconomic characteristics of the local districts. From lowest socioeconomic status to highest, the categories are A, B, CD, DE, FG, GH, I and J.

Students in public school for ninth through twelfth grades attend Woodstown High School in Woodstown, which serves students from Pilesgrove Township and Woodstown, along with students Alloway Township, Oldmans Township and Upper Pittsgrove Township who attend the high school as part of sending/receiving relationships with the Woodstown-Pilesgrove Regional School District. As of the 2020–21 school year, the high school had an enrollment of 579 students and 49.7 classroom teachers (on an FTE basis), for a student–teacher ratio of 11.6:1.

School
Upper Pittsgrove School had an enrollment of 305 students in grades PreK-8 as of the 2020–21 school year.
Philip McFarland, Principal

Administration
Core members of the school's administration are:
Kristin Williams, Interim Superintendent
Katherine Van Tassel, Business Administrator / Board Secretary

Board of education
The district's board of education is comprised of nine members who set policy and oversee the fiscal and educational operation of the district through its administration. As a Type II school district, the board's trustees are elected directly by voters to serve three-year terms of office on a staggered basis, with three seats up for election each year held (since 2012) as part of the November general election. The board appoints a superintendent to oversee the district's day-to-day operations and a business administrator to supervise the business functions of the district.

References

External links
Upper Pittsgrove School District

School Data for the Upper Pittsgrove School District, National Center for Education Statistics
Woodstown High School

Upper Pittsgrove Township, New Jersey
New Jersey District Factor Group DE
School districts in Salem County, New Jersey
Public K–8 schools in New Jersey